Truckee may refer to:

People
Truckee (chief), a Northern Paiute leader, father of Chief Winnemucca and grandfather of Sarah Winnemucca

Places
Truckee, California, a city named after Chief Truckee
Little Truckee River, flows into Truckee River
Truckee Meadows, a valley in northern Nevada
Truckee Range, a mountain range located in western Nevada
Truckee River, a river in northern California and northern Nevada

Other uses
The "Truckee" test, part of the Operation Dominic series of nuclear tests
USS Truckee (AO-147), a U.S. Navy fleet oiler commissioned in 1955 at the Navy Ship Yard in Philadelphia, Pennsylvania and named for the Truckee River; her home port was Norfolk, Virginia